Cory Blackwell (born March 27, 1963) is an American former professional basketball player who was selected by the Seattle SuperSonics in the second round (28th pick overall) of the 1984 NBA draft. A 6'6" forward from the University of Wisconsin–Madison.

Blackwell appeared in only one NBA season, playing for the Sonics during the 1984–85 season, appearing in 60 games and scoring a total of 202 points. He has been a minister for the International Churches of Christ and is a Middle East World Sector Leader (overseeing minister) for the International Christian Churches. He will also begin serving as an Evangelist for their Chicago congregation.

Personal life
Cory Blackwell was born in Chicago. He was raised Sunni Muslim by his mother, Wazirah. After attending Crane Technical High School, located in the westside of Chicago, he was accepted into the University of Wisconsin. He played on the school's basketball team and was later drafted into the NBA.

After his time in the NBA, Blackwell lived in Chicago. Later on he and his then wife, Megan, were baptized there in 1990 into the Chicago International Church of Christ. In 1991, he was asked by Kip McKean to move to LA. In 1994, he and his then wife were selected to be the Middle East World Sector Leaders (WSL) since Cory's mother, Wazirah, was a muslim. In 2000, he and Megan stepped down from the ministry and later they divorced in 2002.

In 2010, Cory Blackwell joined the ICC and after remarrying, he was appointed Middle East WSL. He currently lives in Los Angeles, California. This summer he and his current wife, Jeraldine, are moving to Chicago to lead the Chicago ICC and oversee the Midwest and Middle East from there.  Another of his ex-wives is Charlotte Hayward-Blackwell, mother of NFL defensive tackle Cameron Heyward.

References

1963 births
Living people
African-American basketball players
American expatriate basketball people in Finland
American expatriate basketball people in France
American expatriate basketball people in the Philippines
American expatriate basketball people in Turkey
American men's basketball players
Basketball players from Chicago
Fenerbahçe men's basketball players
Great Taste Coffee Makers players
La Crosse Catbirds players
Philippine Basketball Association imports
Seattle SuperSonics draft picks
Seattle SuperSonics players
Small forwards
Wisconsin Badgers men's basketball players
21st-century African-American people
20th-century African-American sportspeople